Expedition 24 was the 24th long-duration mission to the International Space Station (ISS). Expedition 24 initially had two planned spacewalks, one Russian and one American Extra-vehicular Activity (EVA). The U.S. EVA was re-planned and a second U.S. EVA was added.

Crew 

Source NASA

Backup crew 
 Mikhail Tyurin
 Aleksandr Samokutyayev
 Scott J. Kelly
 Andrei Borisenko
 Paolo Nespoli
 Catherine Coleman

Incidents

Ammonia pump module 
On 31 July 2010, the Expedition 24 crew was awoken by an alarm on the station. The alarm was caused by a cooling pump that had failed and caused a Remote Power Controller to trip and cut power to some of the International Space Station (ISS). Astronauts Tracy Caldwell Dyson and Doug Wheelock performed some steps to assist ground controllers in re-powering some of the station components such as two main power buses and one  Control Moment Gyroscope. After the steps had been completed Capcomm James Kelly told the crew they could go back to bed as all the work required by the crew on the ISS was complete. A short time later, another alarm sounded and awoke the crew, when the ground attempted to restart the pump module.

Docking ring 
A failure in the docking ring on the Mini-Research Module 2 (MRM2) Poisk, caused a delay in the planned landing of the Soyuz TMA-18 spacecraft. Soyuz TMA-18 was originally planned to undock and land on 24 September 2010, but instead undocked less than 24 hours later on 25 September 2010. The failure is believed to be due to a faulty indication from a micro-switch on the hatch between the Soyuz and MRM2. A drive gear, which is related to the docking mechanism was also found to have two broken teeth, and is believed to be related to the problem as well.

Spacewalks 

Three spacewalks, one in Orlan space suits and two in U.S. Extravehicular Mobility Units (EMUs) were originally planned for Expedition 24. However, additional spacewalking tasks were added to remove and replace a failed ammonia pump module.

‡ denotes spacewalks performed from the Pirs docking compartment in Russian Orlan suits.

Gallery

References

External links 

 NASA's Space Station Expeditions page
 
 Expedition 24 Photography

Expeditions to the International Space Station
2010 in spaceflight